Ranks of Bronze is a science fiction novel by American writer David Drake.

Plot summary
A defeated Roman legion is sold into slavery to alien traders seeking low tech soldiers to be used in conflicts to secure trading rights on alien planets. Their new masters soon learn that the Romans are the best low tech fighters that can be found. Given their worth as soldiers and success on the battlefield, the Romans' alien masters provide them with everything, including near immortality. However, the Romans want only one thing, and that is to go home.

Sequels
 Foreign Legions (2002) short stories edited by Drake
 The Excalibur Alternative (2002), David Weber

Release details
 Paperback edition 1986 
 Paperback edition 2001

References

External links
scifi-fantasy-info.com, David drake bibliography
david-drake.com, Author's publication list

1986 American novels
American science fiction novels